The battle of the Campo Vía pocket was a decisive engagement of the Chaco War between Paraguay and Bolivia which took place in December 1933. It was one of the most prominent battles of the Chaco War. Lt Col José Félix Estigarribia, with a massive force of several divisions of the Paraguayan Army, was able to surround two Bolivian divisions around the outpost of Alihuatá.  The encircled troops were forced to capitulate due to lack of supplies on 11 December. Up to 2,000 Bolivian soldiers were killed and 7,000 captured. Barely 900 Bolivian troops escaped. Subsequently, the Paraguayan troops expelled the Bolivian army from the eastern region of Chaco by the end of 1933, forcing the resignation of German General Hans Kundt from the Bolivian High Command.

Bibliography 
 de Quesada, Alejandro (2011). The Chaco War 1932-35: South America’s greatest modern conflict. Osprey Publishing, 
 Masamaclay, historia de la guerra del Chaco, Segunda edición

Battles of the Chaco War
Conflicts in 1933
1933 in Paraguay
1933 in Bolivia
November 1933 events
December 1933 events
History of Presidente Hayes Department